A. R. Rahman Jai Ho Concert: The Journey Home World Tour is the first world tour by Indian musician A. R. Rahman. Rahman organised the tour in 2010, following the success of his soundtrack album Slumdog Millionaire, and particularly the song "Jai Ho". The tour was kicked off on June 11 at the Nassau Coliseum in New York and was initially decided to span 16 major cities worldwide. Amy Tinkham is the choreographer and director of the tour, John Beasley, Music Director, and Deepak Gattani of Rapport Productions produces it. The tour features 23 playback singers from India, along with several instrumentalists and dancers.

The tour was highly successful, with tickets of many of the concerts being sold out several days before the respective event. The Detroit concert was originally planned on 19 June but was postponed when the stage at Pontiac Silverdome collapsed. No injuries were reported, but the concerts had to be rescheduled and the U. S. concerts were resumed only in September.

Tour dates

References

External links
 List of venues

2010 concert tours
Concert tours of Canada
Concert tours of the United Kingdom
Concert tours of the United States
Concert tours of South Africa